Dead Pixels is a British television sitcom, which began airing on E4 on 28 March 2019. It focuses on the obsession of three friends, Meg, Nicky and Usman, for a fictional massive multiplayer online role-playing game (MMORPG) called Kingdom Scrolls.

In July 2019, E4 renewed the programme for a second series which filmed later that year, for an intended spring 2020 broadcast that was delayed until 26 January 2021.

Cast

Main characters 
Alexa Davies as Megan "Meg" Jefferies, whose eagerness to continue playing Kingdom Scrolls is helped by her attraction to a new workmate, who she invites to play the game in an attempt to get closer to him, to the chagrin of the rest of the group.
Will Merrick as Nicholas "Nicky" Kettle, whose attitude to playing Kingdom Scrolls – and in fact his view on life – is considerably more apathetic than that of his flatmate, Meg; his burgeoning attraction to her the primary reason he is determined to complete the game.
Sargon Yelda as Usman, an American airline pilot whose addiction to Kingdom Scrolls consistently takes him away from family life.
Charlotte Ritchie as Alison, the flatmate of Meg and Nicky whose attempts to get the two to live a more 'normal' life falter – and is the subject of barbs from them as a result of living in the real world.
David Mumeni as Russell, a workmate of Meg's who naively blunders into the game and his personal life.

Recurring 
Noush Skaugen as Zara, Usman's wife, who begins to get closer to a work friend in light of her husband's gaming addiction.
Rose Matafeo as Daisy (series 2), a popular Kingdom Scrolls player who has a dedicated legion of followers and starts to get close to Nicky both in the game and in reality.
Al Roberts as DVT (series 2), the leader of The Twelve Disciples, a group of Daisy's ardent followers, who initially accept Nicky but later begin persistently trolling him to come between the two.
Shaq B Grant as Greg (series 2), a boiler repairman who begins a complicated relationship with Meg.

Episodes

Series 1 (2019)
All episodes were made available on All4 after the broadcast of the first episode.

Series 2 (2021)
All episodes were made available on All4 following the broadcast premiere of the first two episodes.

Development
Dead Pixels started as Avatards, which was a part of the Comedy Blaps series on Channel 4's website in 2016, and has since expanded to what it is now. The series creators have been cited as wanting to create a more well-rounded portrayal of the lives of some gamers, noting that mainstream television does not have the best reputation for how it presents gamers on screen. It hopes to do this by showing both the funny and the thought provoking side of gaming and gaming culture. Both the writer of the series, Jon Brown, and the director, Al Campbell, have been described as "massive gamers".

Reception
The series has been described by The Guardian as "wickedly entertaining" and "the sharpest new sitcom of 2019". Chortle said that the first episode of the show is "certainly funny and involving enough to entice any viewer". The Arts Desk noted that the action shifts are "cleverly visualised".

US broadcast
In May 2020, The CW acquired the broadcast rights for the series. Originally procured to plump up the network's autumn 2020 schedule in light of production breakdowns during the COVID-19 pandemic, the series was later shifted to the network's summer 2020 slate instead, with its autumn slot being filled by Devils.

Adaptation
An Indian version of the series has been commissioned by Disney+ Hotstar in association with BBC Studios. It will be produced by BBCS India and Tamada Media, written by Akshay Poolla and directed by Aditya Mandala.

See also
The Guild (web series)

References

External links
Official website

2019 British television series debuts
2021 British television series endings
2010s British sitcoms
2020s British sitcoms
E4 sitcoms
English-language television shows
Television shows about video games